The Central District of Dezful County is a district (bakhsh) in Dezful County, Khuzestan Province, Iran. At the 2006 census, its population was 321,244, in 75,175 families.  The district has six cities: Dezful, Safiabad, Mianrud, Dezab, Siah Mansur & Shamsabad.  The district has two rural districts (dehestan): Qeblehi Rural District and Shamsabad Rural District.

References 

Dezful County
Districts of Khuzestan Province